Péter Pál Kiss (born 6 May 2003) is a Hungarian paracanoeist. He represented Hungary at the 2020 Summer Paralympics.

Career
Kiss represented Hungary at the 2020 Summer Paralympics in the men's KL1 event and won a gold medal.

References

2003 births
Living people
Hungarian male canoeists
Paracanoeists at the 2020 Summer Paralympics
Medalists at the 2020 Summer Paralympics
Paralympic medalists in paracanoe
Paralympic gold medalists for Hungary
ICF Canoe Sprint World Championships medalists in paracanoe
21st-century Hungarian people